"Story of My Life" is a song by Irish singer-songwriter Lesley Roy. The song would have represented Ireland in the Eurovision Song Contest 2020.

Background
The Irish broadcaster RTÉ invited established songwriters and artists to submit songs from which they, in conjunction with 2FM, made a shortlist and chose their entry for the Eurovision Song Contest 2020.

Eurovision Song Contest

The song was meant to represent Ireland in the Eurovision Song Contest 2020, after Lesley Roy was internally selected by the national broadcaster Raidió Teilifís Éireann (RTÉ). On 28 January 2020, a special allocation draw was held which placed each country into one of the two semi-finals, as well as which half of the show they would perform in. Ireland was placed into the first semi-final, to be held on 12 May 2020, and was scheduled to perform in the first half of the show. However, on March 18, 2020, the EBU announced the cancellation of Eurovision 2020 as a direct result of the Coronavirus pandemic in Europe.

Music video
A music video to accompany the release of "Story of My Life" was first released onto YouTube on 5 March 2020. The video was directed by Kate Dolan.

Charts

References

2020 songs
2020 singles
Lesley Roy songs
Eurovision songs of 2020
Eurovision songs of Ireland
Songs written by Lesley Roy
Songs written by Tom Shapiro
Songs written by Catt Gravitt